This is a list of seasons played by Eintracht Braunschweig in German and European football, from their first competitive to the most recent completed season. It details the club's achievements in every competition, as well as the club's average attendance and top scorers for each season since 1947-48. Players in bold were also top scorers in their league that season.

Seasons

1904–1933

1933–1945

1945–1963

Since 1963

Key

(I) = 1st division
(II) = 2nd division
(III) = 3rd division
NF = Season not finished
NP = Competition not played this season
DNE = Did not enter
GC = German championship
NC = Northern German championship
ZOC = British Zone of Occupation championship
EC = European Cup
UC = UEFA Cup
Attendance ⌀ = Average attendance

RS = Regional stages of the German cup
QR = Qualification round
GS = Group stage
R128 = Round of 128
R64 = Round of 64
R32 = Round of 32
R16 = Round of 16
QF = Quarter-finals
SF = Semi-finals
RU = Runners-up
W = Winners

Notes

Sources 
 Eintracht Braunschweig at Fußballdaten.de (in German)
 
 
 

Eintracht Braunschweig
Eintracht Braunschweig
Eintracht Braunschweig